When Forever Comes Crashing is the third studio album by American metalcore band Converge, on April 14, 1998 through Equal Vision Records.

Recording 
The album was recorded at God City Studio from 22 December through 3 January 1998. Steve Austin of Today Is the Day, along with Converge, produced the album and also provided backup vocals on the track "The Lowest Common Denominator".  Jay Randall, from Agoraphobic Nosebleed, Jeff Fineburg, Ben Cummings, Matt Pike (not to be confused with Matt Pike of Sleep and High on Fire fame), Grail Mortillaro, Ryan Parker and Tre McCarthy also appear as backing vocalists.

Release
When Forever Comes Crashing was originally released on April 14, 1998 through Equal Vision Records.

Shortly after the release of Converge's 2004 album You Fail Me through Epitaph Records, Equal Vision reissued remasters of Petitioning the Empty Sky and When Forever Comes Crashing. The updated version of When Forever Comes Crashing featured new artwork from Isis frontman Aaron Turner, production work from Converge's Kurt Ballou in addition to Mike Poorman and Alan Douches, and an demo version of "Bitter and Then Some" as a bonus track. The liner notes also contain the second part of the essay written by the "Aggressive Tendencies" columnist and editor of the Canadian online magazine Exclaim!, Chris Gramlich. The first part of the essay is found on the Petitioning the Empty Sky remaster.

In 2006, Jacob Bannon's Deathwish Inc. released a vinyl box set collection for the remasters of Petitioning the Empty Sky and When Forever Comes Crashing in a package dubbed Petitioning Forever.

Track listing

Personnel 

Converge
 Jacob Bannon – vocals
 Kurt Ballou – guitar, vocals
 Aaron Dalbec – guitar
 Steve Brodsky – bass guitar, guitar (track 8)
 Damon Bellorado – drum kit

Additional musicians
Travis Shettel – cymbal on "Letterbomb"

Production and recording history
 Steve Austin – mixing, engineer, producer
 Kurt Ballou – mixing, engineer, electronics
 Jacob Bannon – mixing
 Dean Baltulonis – digital editingGuest musicians
Ben Cummings (Bane) – backing vocals
Grail Mortillaro – backing vocals
Jay Randall (Agoraphobic Nosebleed) – backing vocals
Jeff Feinburg – backing vocals
Matt Pike – backing vocals
Ryan Parker – backing vocals
Tre McCarthy – backing vocals

Artwork and design
 Jacob Bannon – design
 Grail Mortillaro - photography

References

Converge (band) albums
1998 albums
2005 albums
Equal Vision Records albums
Albums with cover art by Aaron Turner